Biechówko refers to the following places in Poland:

 Biechówko, Greater Poland Voivodeship
 Biechówko, Kuyavian-Pomeranian Voivodeship